Dipsas temporalis, the temporal snail-eater, is a non-venomous snake found in Panama, Ecuador, and Colombia.

References

Dipsas
Snakes of North America
Snakes of South America
Reptiles of Panama]
Reptiles of Ecuador
Reptiles of Colombia
Reptiles described in 1909
Taxa named by Franz Werner